Goudargues is a commune in the Gard department in southern France. Known locally as the Venise Gardoise, because of the canal that flows through it centre. This is lined with pavement cafés and shaded by a two rows of mature plane trees.

History
The Romans are known to have been present in the locality. In AD 800, Benedictine monks from Aniane founded an abbey around the lake of Gordanicus. This lake, near the Cèze was fed by natural springs. It was this abbey that is the basis of modern Goudargues- and the settlements name is derived from Gordanicus.

Geography
The village of Goudargues is situated in the Cèze valley, to the north of the Gard department. Not too far from Avignon, the Pont du Gard, Uzès and Nîmes.

Population

See also
Communes of the Gard department

References

Communes of Gard